Schilderina achatidea, common name agate cowry, is a species of sea snail, a cowry, a marine gastropod mollusk in the family Cypraeidae, the cowries.

Description
The shell size varies between 22 mm and 50 mm. The dorsum surface is usually brown, while the base is white.

Distribution
This species can be found in the Mediterranean Sea and in northwestern Africa.

Subspecies
 Schilderina achatidea achatidea  Gray in Sowerby II, 1837
 Schilderina achatidea inopinata Schilder, 1930
 Schilderina achatidea verdensis (Lorenz, 2017)

References

 Repetto G., Orlando F. & Arduino G. (2005): Conchiglie del Mediterraneo, Amici del Museo "Federico Eusebio", Alba, Italy
 Ricardo Vega Luz Comportamento di Schilderia achatidea in cattività

External links
 
 Biolib
 Cypraea.eu

Cypraeidae
Gastropods described in 1837